Paul Stoner Smith (May 7, 1888 – July 3, 1958) was a Major League Baseball outfielder. Smith played in 10 games in the 1916 season with the Cincinnati Reds. He had 10 hits in 44 at-bats with a .227 batting average.

Smith was born in Mount Zion, Illinois and died in Decatur, Illinois.

External links
 Baseball-Reference page

Cincinnati Reds players
1888 births
1958 deaths
Baseball players from Illinois
Sportspeople from Decatur, Illinois
Lincoln Abes players
Canton Chinks players
Adrian Champs players
Montreal Royals players
Milwaukee Brewers (minor league) players
Syracuse Stars (minor league baseball) players
Rochester Colts players
People from Macon County, Illinois